Big Life Foundation ("Big Life") is non-profit conservation organization focused on preserving the wildlife and habitats of the Amboseli-Tsavo-Kilimanjaro ecosystem of East Africa through community-based and collaborative strategies.

Mission

“On the ground in Africa, partnering with communities to protect nature for the benefit of all.”
 
Big Life's mission is to protect and sustain the wildlife and habitats of the more than 1.6 million acres in the greater Amboseli ecosystem, including one of the largest populations of elephants remaining in East Africa. It is the first organization in East Africa to achieve coordinated cross-border operations between Kenya and Tanzania. Big Life's conservation effort focuses on collaborating closely with local communities, partner NGOs, national parks, and government agencies. This collaborative approach is at the heart of Big Life's philosophy “envisioning a world in which conservation supports the people and people support conservation.”

History

The roots of Big Life Foundation began in photographer Nick Brandt's expeditions to take studio-like portraits of the animals of the Amboseli region. Discovering that the elephant subjects of his photographs were being killed by rampant poaching, Brandt embarked to establish a locally-based conservation effort focused on preserving the wildlife of the ecosystem. This undertaking led to the formation of Big Life Foundation, co-founded in September 2010 by Brandt, conservationist Richard Bonham, and entrepreneur Tom Hill. Bonham and Hill had been engaged in conservation work in the region with the Maasailand Preservation Trust for the prior two decades; this effort was significantly expanded and became Big Life Foundation.

Conservation Approach

Big Life's conservation approach focuses on three key areas: wildlife protection (including elephants, rhinos, and predators), human-wildlife conflict abatement, and community enrichment through employment, education, and health initiatives.

Wildlife Protection

Big Life's primary conservation mission is to prevent the poaching of elephants and all wildlife within the more than 1.6 million acres of wilderness in the Amboseli-Tsavo-Kilimanjaro ecosystem.
This wildlife protection effort currently employs hundreds of local Maasai rangers—with more than thirty permanent outposts and tent-based field units, thirteen Land Cruiser patrol vehicles, three tracker dogs, and two planes for aerial surveillance.
In addition to preventative measures, Big Life partners with local communities to track and apprehend poachers and collaborates with local prosecutors to ensure that wildlife criminals are punished to the fullest extent of the law.

Rhino Protection
The East African black rhinoceros is one of the most endangered species on Earth. Big Life works in partnership with the Kenya Wildlife Service to protect the Eastern black rhino in the Chyulu Hills area. Together, the two organizations conduct extensive foot patrols, aerial surveillance, monitoring via camera traps, and engage in direct confrontation with rhino poachers when necessary.

Predator Protection
For the Maasai herders in Big Life's area of operation, cattle are their livelihood and subsistence. Living in close proximity to predators like lions or hyenas means the Maasai's livestock often falls victim to predation. To discourage herders from retaliating with spears or poisoned carcasses, Big Life and local communities developed a compensation program, the Predator Compensation Fund. This fund protects lions, and other carnivores in the ecosystem, by partially compensating local Maasai for economic losses due to predation. In return, communities agree not to kill predators in retaliation.

Human-Wildlife Conflict Abatement

Growing human population in the Amboseli-Tsavo-Kilimanjaro region has led to increased human-wildlife conflict, often with catastrophic and deadly results for both people and animals.
Big Life works in partnership with the local Maasai to reduce the negative impact of human-wildlife interactions, such as crop-raiding by hungry elephants. Co-founder Bonham notes, “An elephant can trample a crop in 10 minutes. This year we have had four people killed by them. We try to scare them. We have guys out at night. We use bangers and paint ball guns to shoot chilly [sic] bombs. When one hits an elephant, they get a whiff and a sore nose. But they realise that big bangs are not dangerous. They learn.” Human-wildlife conflict remains one of the greatest challenges with initiatives such as elephant-proof fencing as one possible solution.

Community Enrichment

Big Life supports the future of communities in East Africa by funding teachers’ salaries, providing scholarship funds for local students, and conducting conservation workshops. “...if we are to save these endangered species from extinction, we're going to have to save the humans first. For far too long now right across the continent wildlife is being wiped out because poverty is shoved into the unsolvable box.”

Maasai Olympics
In 2008, Big Life was approached by Maasai elders for assistance in ending lion hunting within the Maasai warrior culture. This event marked the beginning of a collaboration that would eventually lead to the first-ever Maasai Olympics, “an organised Maasai sports competition based upon traditional warrior skills.” Now a biennial event, the Maasai Olympics has become part of creating a shift in the cultural attitudes of the Maasai away from competitive and ritual lion killing towards a broader commitment to wildlife and habitat conservation.

References

External links
 https://biglife.org/
 https://www.maasaiolympics.com/

Elephant conservation organizations
Wildlife conservation in Kenya
Amboseli National Park